Kaang (Kaang Chin; also rendered Kang, M’kaang, Mgan) is a Kuki-Chin language spoken by about 35,000 people in Mindat Township and Matupi Township, Chin State, Burma. Under Kaang Chin, there are three groups, namely (1) Zo Kaang,(2) Puei Kaang, and (3) Cum Kaang.

References

Kuki-Chin languages